Code Lyoko is a French animated television series created by Thomas Romain and Tania Palumbo and produced by Antefilms Production (season 1) and MoonScoop Group (seasons 2–4) for France 3 and Canal J, with the participation of Conseil Général de la Charente, Pôle Image Magelis, Région Poitou-Charentes and Wallimage. The series centers on a group of teenagers who travel to the virtual world of Lyoko to battle against a malignant artificial intelligence known as X.A.N.A. who threatens Earth with powers to access the real world and cause trouble. The scenes in the real world employ traditional animation with hand-painted backgrounds, while the scenes in Lyoko are presented in 3D CGI animation.

The series began its first, 97-episode run on 3 September 2003, on France's France 3, and ended on 10 November 2007. It started airing in the United States on 19 April 2004 on Cartoon Network.

Code Lyoko aired every day on Cartoon Network, and was also in their Miguzi and Master Control programming blocks, at 5:00 or 5:30 P.M. U.S. Eastern Time, sometimes even showing two new back-to-back episodes consecutively, in the cases of season finales.

A follow-up series, Code Lyoko: Evolution, began airing at the end of 2012. This "sequel" to the series featured live-action sequences for scenes taking place in the real world instead of its traditional 2D animation but retained the iconic CGI for scenes taking place in Lyoko, now with an updated style. The show consisted of 26 episodes with the final episode airing in late 2013, leaving off on a cliffhanger with no second season planned as MoonScoop later filed for bankruptcy in 2014.

Plot 
Jeremy Belpois, an 8th grade prodigy attending boarding school at Kadic Academy, discovers a quantum supercomputer in an abandoned factory near his school. Upon activating it, he discovers a virtual world called Lyoko with an artificially intelligent girl named Aelita trapped inside it. Jeremy learns of X.A.N.A., a fully autonomous, malevolent, and highly intelligent multi-agent system, that also dwells within the Supercomputer. Using Lyoko's powers, X.A.N.A can possess electronics and objects in the real world like a virus to wreak havoc. X.A.N.A.'s primary objective is to eliminate anyone aware of the Supercomputer's existence so that it will be free to conquer the real world and destroy all humanity.

Jeremy works tirelessly to materialize Aelita into the real world and stop attacks caused by X.A.N.A. Jeremy is aided by his three friends Odd Della Robbia, Ulrich Stern, and Yumi Ishiyama, who are virtualized into Lyoko to save both worlds from the sinister virtual entity. They achieve this by escorting Aelita to various Towers on Lyoko, which serve as interface terminals between Lyoko and Earth. Once the Tower is deactivated, Jeremy can launch a "Return to the Past" program, which sends the world back in time to undo any damage caused by X.A.N.A., while anyone scanned into the Supercomputer retains their memory of the events. In "Code: Earth," Aelita is finally materialized, but the group discovers that X.A.N.A. had planted a virus inside of her that will kill her if the Supercomputer is turned off. They realize that they cannot destroy X.A.N.A, or Aelita will be destroyed along with it.

In Season 2, Aelita adjusts to life in the real world, while Jeremy attempts to develop an antivirus program to liberate her from X.A.N.A.'s power. On Lyoko, a fifth sector is discovered and the group explores more of Lyoko's secrets and mysteries. The gang begins to uncover information about a mysterious man named Franz Hopper, who went missing ten years ago. He supposedly created the Supercomputer, Lyoko, and X.A.N.A., and is eventually discovered to be Aelita's father. They finally find out that Franz Hopper is indeed alive somewhere, hiding in the uncharted parts of Lyoko to avoid X.A.N.A. further. All the while, X.A.N.A. attempts to steal Aelita's memory to gain the Keys to Lyoko and escape into the internet. At the end of the season, the group discovers that Aelita is actually human and does not have a virus, and instead is missing a fragment of herself. In "The Key," X.A.N.A. tricks them with a fake and succeeds in stealing Aelita's memory and escaping the Supercomputer. Aelita appears to perish as a result but is revived when Franz Hopper restores her completely, along with her missing fragment: the memories of her life on Earth before she was virtualized on Lyoko.

Season 3 shows that since succeeding in escaping the confinements of the supercomputer, X.A.N.A. targets the virtual world itself by destroying each of Lyoko's surface sectors, until only Sector Five is left. Initially reluctant, the Lyoko Warriors decide to invite William Dunbar as the sixth member. However, shortly after being virtualized, he is possessed by X.A.N.A.. Shortly after, he destroys the Core of Lyoko, destroying the entire virtual world and rendering the group unable to fight X.A.N.A., putting the entire real world in danger. After what they thought was their defeat, Jeremy receives a coded message from Franz Hopper that allows him to recreate Lyoko and continue the fight against X.A.N.A.

In Season 4, Jeremy and Aelita construct a digital submarine, the Skidbladnir, to travel across the Digital Sea to destroy X.A.N.A.'s "Replikas," which are copies of Lyoko's sectors that are linked to X.A.N.A.-controlled supercomputers on Earth, all created for its goal of world domination. X.A.N.A. uses William as its general throughout the season to defend the Replikas and target the Lyoko Warriors in any way he can. To prevent suspicion regarding William's disappearance, Jeremy manages to program a specter to take William's place at Kadic, although the clone has low-level intelligence and acts very stupidly. Near the end of the season, X.A.N.A. decides to draw energy from all of its Replikas to create the Kolossus, a gigantic monster that later destroys the Skidbladnir. Before it is destroyed, Jeremy frees William from X.A.N.A.'s control. After his return, he has a difficult time gaining the trust of the group. While Ulrich defeats the Kolossus, Franz Hopper sacrifices himself to power Jeremy's "anti-X.A.N.A. program," which destroys X.A.N.A. forever upon activation. Shortly after, the group, albeit reluctant due to their nostalgia, decides to shut down the Supercomputer.

Characters

Lyoko Warriors

 Jeremy Belpois (French: Jérémy Belpois; formerly Jeremie (French: Jérémie) in season 1)
Voiced by: Raphaëlle Bruneau (French); Sharon Mann (English)
A 12-year-old (later 13-year-old) top-of-the-class student who finds and starts the factory's supercomputer while looking for parts to build a robot. By turning on the Supercomputer, he reawakened Aelita, the virtual world of Lyoko, and the malevolent multi-agent system X.A.N.A.. His goals are mainly driven by his desire to protect Aelita, whom he has a crush on, and to save her from the Supercomputer and X.A.N.A. by materializing her on Earth. As part of the group, he specializes in programming new ways to defeat X.A.N.A. and monitors the group while they are on Lyoko. Because he is not very athletic and is more computer savvy, Jeremy almost never goes to Lyoko, only going there once and vowing to never do it again. His workaholic attitude occasionally puts a strain on his relationships with the other members of the group.

 Aelita Schaeffer
Voiced by: Sophie Landresse (French); Sharon Mann (English)
Mainly known by her alias Aelita Stones, Aelita is the smartest of the group alongside Jeremy. At the beginning of the series, she was trapped within Lyoko, inside the Supercomputer. She was originally thought to be an AI until it was revealed that she's the daughter of Franz Hopper, the creator of the world of Lyoko. As a little girl, she lost her mother. When a group of suited men came to her home, she and her father fled and virtualized themselves on Lyoko. Between the virtualization and Jeremy's discovery of the Supercomputer, X.A.N.A. stole an important memory fragment that inhibited her from becoming fully human again. After this fragment is retrieved, she is no longer linked to the Supercomputer. After becoming human, she often has nightmares of her past life. She later enrolls as a boarder at Kadic under the alias Aelita Stones, claiming to be Odd's cousin. She reciprocates Jeremy's feelings for her, but he often strains their relationship by overlooking Aelita and her passions in favor of working on the Supercomputer.
Aelita is the only one capable of deactivating towers on Lyoko to stop X.A.N.A.'s attacks. On Lyoko, she has an elf-like appearance, similar to that of "Mr. Pück," a toy elf from her childhood. She has the "power of creation": the ability to create or remove objects, such as rocks or bridges, from the virtual environment. She had no weapons or defense until season 3 of the show when she developed the ability to use "energy fields," pink balls of plasma that can be thrown or used to block enemy fire. In season 4, Jeremy programs light pink angel wings as part of her new virtual attire, allowing her to fly and carry one other person.

 Odd Della Robbia
Voiced by: Raphaëlle Bruneau (French); Christophe Caballero and Matthew Géczy (English)
The comic relief of the group. Odd is credited as having great potential when it comes to school, but rarely uses it, and as a result of this, he gets bad grades due to his lack of studying. He shares a dorm with Ulrich and has a dog named Kiwi, who he hides in a dresser because pets aren't allowed at Kadic. He's considered a ladies' man and has dated many of the girls at his school, but his romances tend to last only a few days. Before he attended Kadic, he lived with his parents and his five sisters. Odd's blond hair has a purple spot and is worn up in a spike. 
On Lyoko, he is clothed like a cat, with a tail and clawed gloves that shoot "laser arrows." In season 1 he had a precognitive power named "Future Flash", but it was deleted before season 2 and is replaced by his defensive ability to create a purple energy shield by crossing his arms in front of his body, covering half of his body. Another one of Odd's abilities is being able to use his claws to climb on walls like a cat.

 Ulrich Stern
Voiced by: Marie-Line Landerwijn (French); Barbara Weber-Scaff (English)
A more reserved member of the group, Ulrich has a hard time sharing his feelings. His parents pressure him to achieve well in school, but he has difficulty learning and living up to their expectations. In his off-time, he practices Pencak silat with Yumi, whom he has a crush on. He suffers from vertigo, which makes it hard to participate in activities such as rock climbing. Due to his many activities, Ulrich has a rather muscular build, thus many girls (particularly Sissi) consider him to be extremely handsome.
On Lyoko, he wears a yellow and brown outfit inspired by Japanese samurai. His main weapon is a katana, and can dual wield them. His "Supersprint" ability allows him to dash at high speed, and his "Triplicate" power lets him create two clones of himself. He can combine these abilities in a technique called "Triangulate," using his clones to form a triangle around an enemy and ambush it from behind when it is distracted.

 Yumi Ishiyama
Voiced by: Géraldine Frippiat (French); Mirabelle Kirkland (English)
A fairly reserved student who lives near and attends Kadic. She is the oldest of the group. She is of Japanese descent and has one younger brother, Hiroki. Because of her parents and culture, she must maintain good grades and observe family values. At home, she generally has to deal with marital issues between her parents. She is a friend of William Dunbar, who transferred to Kadic during season 2. She practices pencak silat with Ulrich, whom she has a crush on, though it's not as obvious as Ulrich's crush on her. She always wears black and has enough basic knowledge of the Supercomputer to operate it in Jeremy and Aelita's absence.
On Lyoko, Yumi is dressed in a geisha-inspired outfit with an obi sash. Her main weapon is a Tessen fan, being given an additional one since the second season, and her one-and-only power is telekinesis, allowing her to move objects and levitate her three best friends with her mind alone; it is rarely used as it tires her out pretty quickly. During the fourth season, we see more of this ability being used by Yumi, this time with more ease and control.

 William Dunbar
Voiced by: Mathieu Moreau (French); David Gasman (English)
An overconfident student who starts attending Kadic Academy after he was expelled from his previous school for vandalism. Yumi befriends him and he soon develops feelings for her. He often fights with Ulrich for Yumi's attention and is sometimes disrespectful of Yumi's boundaries, causing her to become frustrated with his unwanted advances. After proving helpful to the group during several X.A.N.A. attacks, they vote on whether he should be allowed to join the group, but Yumi votes no and his memory is erased. Eventually, however, the vote becomes unanimous when William's membership is deemed necessary.
On his first mission on Lyoko, William is captured and possessed by X.A.N.A., who ensnares William as its puppet. From that point on, a clone of William, created by Jeremy, is used to pose as the real William until Jeremy is able to free him. Unfortunately, Jeremy's program is imperfect, causing the William clone to act either unintelligent or unpredictable. Near the end of the series, the clone starts developing several human-like traits, which he eventually uses to help the warriors. Towards the end of the series, William is finally released from X.A.N.A.'s control.
On Lyoko, William wears a white outfit and carries a giant sword, which can release shock waves. Under X.A.N.A.'s control, his outfit turns black and he gains a spiked gauntlet on his wrist, which can be used for defense. He has an array of powers including enhanced strength; "Supersmoke," which allows him to transform into a cloud of black smoke and move around at great speed, eventually gaining the ability to fly as well; a second sight allowing him to see across great distances; and levitation. X.A.N.A. sends William to stop the Lyoko Warriors on the virtual world, and thanks to his natural abilities strengthened even further by the artificial intelligence, he proved to be a formidable opponent. He is finally released in "Down to Earth."

Villains
 X.A.N.A.
Sometimes known as XANA, is an evil and powerful computer virus based on a multi-agent system. It is merciless, craves destruction, and serves as the central antagonist of the series. It was originally created by Franz Hopper to destroy Project Carthage: a military communications system that Franz Hopper had previously been involved with. He mentions that his motives were to prevent the French government from obtaining access to Project Carthage. Unfortunately, due to his repeated returns to the past, X.A.N.A. evolved until it achieved self-awareness, choosing to betray Franz and trap him and his daughter Aelita inside Lyoko. Franz has no choice but to shut down the Supercomputer to stop its rampage. After it was reawakened in the present day, X.A.N.A. continues to wreak havoc on Earth and displays no mercy towards those who stand in its way. It grows smarter and more powerful with every return in time, and can think of greater plans and goals beyond random destruction.

X.A.N.A. has no actual physical form as a program. Instead, X.A.N.A. activates Lyoko structures called "Towers" to access the real world with virus extensions of its multi-agent system while remaining inside the Supercomputer, and can only be stopped by deactivating the Towers. On Earth, X.A.N.A. can manipulate and channel electromagnetic phenomena and hack networks or manifest ghostly spectres from outlets at will to possess objects or living things like a virus to bend to its will (usually marked with its eye symbol as a sign of its control) to wreak havoc or target its enemies. After evolving further, X.A.N.A. learns to possess humans or manifest polymorphic spectres to follow its orders as pixelized vessels with its spectral or electrical abilities. On Lyoko, it creates deadly monsters to fight enemies and attack virtual targets, and uses programs to alter environments, plant bugs or viruses, manipulate incomplete warriors, or create virtual objects.

The only known physical incarnation of X.A.N.A. appeared in season 1, in the episode titled "Ghost Channel," where after having its disguise as Jeremy being exposed, he transformed into a demonic caricature figure of Jeremy and tried to kill all of the Warriors. X.A.N.A.'s voice was provided by David Gasman in this episode.

As X.A.N.A. continues to increase its power, its ambition also develop throughout the series. It steals the Keys to Lyoko from Aelita to escape from the Supercomputer and access the world network. Upon its escape, X.A.N.A. becomes more ruthless and aggressive, now trying to destroy Lyoko to make the team powerless against it (succeeded at the end of the third season, but was recreated after) and possessing William to become its weapon. After that, X.A.N.A. also targets Franz Hopper, the biggest threat and the reason why the group keeps surviving. At the same time, the heroes discover X.A.N.A. has infected hundreds of other supercomputers in the network to build weapons and technology to conquer the world. Near the end of the series, the group manage to free William and although it succeeded in killing Franz Hopper in the final battle, the team successfully destroyed X.A.N.A. everywhere in the network with Jeremy's multi-agent program, but only for a time.

Monsters
X.A.N.A. can program many types of monsters on Lyoko to fight, guard Towers, or attack important targets. The monsters generally appear to be organic/mechanical creatures based on various animals and insects. X.A.N.A.'s monster types include Kankrelats, Hornets, Bloks, Krabs, Megatanks, Tarantulas, Creepers, and Mantas. These monsters can be destroyed by hitting the Eye of X.A.N.A. on their bodies. In the Digital Sea, it uses monsters such as Kongers, Sharks, and the Kalamar. It also created the Scyphozoa, which it uses to steal data, drain energy, or brainwash warriors. There is also its ultimate monster, the Kolossus, which appeared in the last three episodes and is fueled by the combined power of its network Replikas. In the videogames, some monsters are exclusive to fight such as Cyberhoppers, Skarabs and Skorpion from Get Ready to Virtualize, Insekts, Volkanoids, Mountain Bug, Insekt Lord, Ice Spider, Desert Driller and Magma Worm in Quest for Infinity and Fall of X.A.N.A., other varients are called "Dark Monsters" which are equipped with different abilities when in combat.

Recurring characters
 Elisabeth "Sissi" Delmas
Voiced by: Carole Baillien (French); Christine Flowers and Jodi Forrest (English)
The principal's daughter and a Kadic student. She is a mean, spoiled, conceited, but also beautiful and somewhat popular girl who has had a huge crush on Ulrich since before attending Kadic. Sissi and Odd quite often make fun of each other, with Odd making clever comebacks whenever Sissi says something rude or whenever they need her to go away. After Aelita is first materialized, she often does the same. Sissi tends to make fun of and openly insult Yumi in particular, mostly due to Ulrich liking Yumi more than her. Sissi is often followed by Herb and Nicolas, whom she often shows resentment towards, but uses them to her advantage anyway. She was initially part of the gang and knew about Lyoko, but was kicked out after breaking her oath to keep the Supercomputer a secret. Her memories of Lyoko were subsequently erased. She becomes friends with the Lyoko Warriors at the end of the series. Sissi also shows a dislike for her full name, Elisabeth, often making sounds of disgust when it's mentioned.

 Herb Pichon (French: Hervé Pichon)
Voiced by: Bruno Mullenaerts (French); David Gasman (English)
An eighth-grader at Kadic and a classmate to the Lyoko Warriors. He is the second-in-command of Sissi's gang, and sometimes even the boss in times of emergency when Sissi proves to be incompetent, as he is the most intelligent member of their group. Herb is also shown to be in love with Sissi, although he doesn't tell her because of her crushes on various boys, most notably Ulrich. He is the second-best student in his class after Jeremy and the two often compete with each other, but Herb is almost always the loser. Herb is also shown to be easily scared off, quick to run away when something troubling happens.

 Nicolas Poliakoff
Voiced by: Carole Baillien (French); Matthew Géczy (English)
An eighth-grader at Kadic. He is the third member of Sissi's gang. He usually does not show much intelligence, which is commonly conveyed through his frequent use of pauses and uhs in speech. He usually only does things when Sissi orders him to, and will otherwise not do much on his own. Nicolas also has also been shown to have a crush on Aelita, although he never acts on it. He can play the drums, and was in the Pop Rock Progressives, a band started by Odd. He is generally more tolerant of and less rude toward the Lyoko Warriors than Herb and Sissi are. In some episodes, it is shown that he has at least some degree of intelligence, as he wrote a script for a performance of Romeo and Juliet. Nicolas is also shown to be as easily frightened as Herb is.

 Jean-Pierre Delmas
Voiced by: Bruno Mullenaerts (French); Allan Wenger (English)
The principal of Kadic Academy, who is easily controlled by his daughter Sissi. He can be stubborn and incredibly ignorant at times, especially when members of the Lyoko Warriors are trying to convince him of any dangerous activity caused by X.A.N.A.. His appearance is based on Hayao Miyazaki.

 Jim Morales (French: Jim Moralès)
Voiced by: Frédéric Meaux (French); David Gasman (English)
The physical education teacher at Kadic Academy and the chief disciplinarian. He is frequently mentioned to have had an extensive job history, although whenever it comes up, he almost always ends up dismissing it by saying, "I'd rather not talk about it." Jim is often shown to digress from his lectures as he starts to reminisce on stories of his past, usually before being interrupted by someone or cutting himself off. On several occasions, Jim has discovered the existence of Lyoko or X.A.N.A. and displayed his helpfulness and willingness to keep it a secret, however, his memories are always erased through the use of a "Return to the Past." One of his more notable secrets is that he once starred in a film called Paco, the King of Disco.

 Suzanne Hertz
Voiced by: Nathalie Stas (French); Jodi Forrest (English)
Usually referred to as Mrs. Hertz, she's a science teacher at Kadic. She is the most shown primary academics teacher in the series and appears to teach most branches of science at Kadic. She is also the only faculty member shown to organize field trips, which happens on several occasions. She has been shown to dislike or be disappointed in Odd and Ulrich, but takes a liking to Jeremy, and later Aelita.

 Milly Solovieff and Tamiya Diop
Milly voiced by: Mirabelle Kirkland; (English)
Tamiya voiced by: Julie Basecqz (French); Barbara Weber-Scaff (English)
The sole members of the Kadic News crew, who are both are in sixth grade and share a dorm room. Tamiya is of Franco-African descent and seems to be less driven by her emotions, which allows her to think more clearly than Milly when bad things happen to them.

 Hiroki Ishiyama
Voiced by: Barbara Weber-Scaff (English) 
Yumi's younger brother. He is often shown pestering her about things and purposely being annoying, such as asking her to do his homework or mentioning her feelings for Ulrich. He is frequently shown playing on a handheld gaming device, and is often shown with his friend, Johnny Cleary. Hiroki has, on occasion, assisted Yumi when she needed it, although he usually requires some form of bribe.

 Takeho and Akiko Ishiyama
Takeho voiced by: David Gasman (English) 
Akiko voiced by: Jodi Forrest (English) 
The parents of Yumi and Hiroki. Takeho is shown to be a fairly typical semi-strict busy father and works for a local branch of a Japanese company. Akiko is depicted as a typical non-working housewife and is generally the first one to ask Yumi if something is wrong. When her parents appear in an episode, it usually focuses on Yumi's family issues.

It is implied that Takeho and Akiho have a low-key fractious relationship, with semi-frequent arguments that their children sometimes overhear. This seems to contribute to Yumi's reserve, and possibly, her reticence in pursuing a more serious emotional relationship with Ulrich.

Supporting characters
 Waldo Franz Schaeffer
Voiced by: Mathieu Moreau (French); Paul Bandey (season 2), Alan Wenger (season 4) (English)
More commonly known as Franz Hopper (a combination of his middle name and the maiden name of his wife) he is/was the creator of both Lyoko and X.A.N.A., and was involved in the creation of Project Carthage. His wife Anthea was kidnapped by men in black suits and he was forced to flee with his young daughter Aelita. The two went to live in a house called the Hermitage, located in a park near Kadic Academy and the abandoned factory. While working as a science teacher at the school, he constructed the Supercomputer in the factory, and programmed X.A.N.A. and the virtual world of Lyoko within it. When the men in black suits tracked him down again, he took Aelita to the factory and virtualized her onto Lyoko with him, where he believed they would be safe. However, X.A.N.A. refused to obey its creator's orders or live in peace alongside Franz and his daughter. Franz was forced to shut the Supercomputer down until it was eventually discovered by Jeremy nearly ten years later. In one of the final episodes of the show, he sacrifices himself to allow Jeremy to finally destroy X.A.N.A.

 Yolanda Perraudin (French: Yolande Perraudin; referred to as Dorothy in Season 1 of the English dub)
Voiced by: Alexandra Correa (French); Jodi Forrest (English)
The school nurse who often aids the students injuries from any incidents, in "X.A.N.A.'s Kiss" Jim was kissed by a Polymorphic Specter disguise as her and attempted to ask her for a date, much to her confusion.

 Samantha "Sam" Knight
Voiced by: Jodi Forrest (English)
One of Odd's ex-girlfriends that only appears in two episodes, she first appears in "Rock Bottom?" where Odd hires her as a DJ to Yumi's party but was short lived after X.A.N.A. caused a earthquake to sink the school. She appears again in "Final Round" where both Odd and her enter a skating competition.

 Johnny Cleary
Voiced by: Jodi Forrest (English)
Hiroki's best friend that introduced in Season 3. It is revealed in "The Pretender" that he has a crush on Yumi, despite their age difference and he asks Ulrich for dating advice (which is embarrassing because Ulrich also loves her).

 Anthea Hopper-Schaeffer
Voiced by: Sharon Mann (English)
Aelita's pink-haired mother who was kidnapped by a group of Men in Black when they lived at a Mountain Cabin, this traumatized Aelita with nightmares and hallucinations of her imaging the mysterious men as a pack of ravenous wolves while herself resembles her doll Mister Pück. In the open-ended sequel, her hair is blonde.

Development

Origins 
Code Lyoko originates from the film short Les enfants font leur cinéma ("The children make their movies"), directed by Thomas Romain and produced by a group of students from Parisian visual arts school Gobelins School of the Image. Romain worked with Tania Palumbo, Stanislas Brunet, and Jerome Cottray to create the film, which was screened at the 2000 Annecy International Animated Film Festival. French animation company Antefilms took interest in the film due to its atmosphere and offered Romain and Palumbo a contract to turn it into a series. This led to the development of the pilot, Garage Kids.

Garage Kids was produced in 2001 by Antefilms. The project was created by Palumbo, Romain, and Carlo de Boutiny and developed by Anne de Galard. Its producers were Eric Garnet, Nicolas Atlan, Benoît di Sabatino, and Christophe di Sabatino.

Similar to its succeeding show Code Lyoko, Garage Kids was originally envisioned as a 26-episode miniseries detailing the lives of four French boarding school students who discover the secret of the virtual world of Xanadu; created by a research group headed by a character known as the "Professor". The pilot featured both traditional animation and CGI. The Matrix had "enormous influence" on the pilot according to Romain, citing the concept of a machine allowing the characters to dive in a virtual world, an operator who supervises the trip and the correlation between the action in the real world and the virtual world. Anime also served as inspiration, specifically Serial Experiments Lain for its "worrying digital dimension" and Neon Genesis Evangelion for its dangerous entities to fight. While similarities to Tron have been noted, Romain admitted to not having seen the film yet when the series was being developed.

When the concept on the virtual world was added, Antefilms suggested animating it with CGI to help make the series unique, promote a video game theme and make the separation between the virtual and real worlds clearer. While incorporating it, Palumbo and Romain wanted to avoid making the series "too playful and superficial" and sought to "get around the censoring done by TV channels that tend to soften youth programs" by writing episodes "with tension, suspense, even tragic scenes. Things that are hard to imagine seeing in a cartoon series for kids."

The desire to further separate the real world from the virtual world lead to the characters losing their powers in the real world, which was present in Garage Kids' pilot. A team of artists were also recruited in order to give the backgrounds of the real world a realistic appearance. The factory and boarding schools specifically were modelled after locations in France. The factory was based on a Renault production plant in Boulogne-Billancourt (Île Seguin), which has since been demolished. The school, Kadic Academy, is based on Lycée Lakanal in Sceaux. Palumbo and Romain were adamant on keeping the locales based on "the France we knew", as they wanted to avoid what they perceived as "fantastical" or "Americanized" locations other French cartoons used at the time.

Networks were hesitant to Garage Kids due to its serial nature, as they feared it would alienate potential viewers who missed the first episodes and they wanted to rerun the series without worrying about episode order. This lead the writing team to shift to a more episodic format. Romain ultimately chose to leave the series after this change in 2003 to work on the French-Japanese anime series Ōban Star-Racers. Tania Palumbo remained on the series through its conclusion as creative director. She designed and named the main characters, with Jeremy being named after one of her and Romain's classmates at Gobelins. The series' human character designs were primarily influenced by Japanese animator Kōji Morimoto's style.

After the series was sold to France 3 and Canal J, producers felt "Garage Kids" was too unclear for a title and requested it be renamed. Palumbo and production manager Anne de Galard ultimately settled on "Code Lyoko", with Lyoko originating from the Japanese word "ryoko" meaning "travel" to further emphasis the dive into the virtual world. The virtual world was subsequently renamed "Lyoko" as well.

Writing 
The writing process for Code Lyoko usually began with the head writer asking the other writers for story pitches. If they liked an idea, it next had to receive approval from the show's director, producers and broadcasters before it could be turned into a 4-page synopsis. After going through the approval process again, it was then expanded into a script and approved one last time to be sent off for production. Writing an episode typically lasted 2–3 weeks, though some took longer if higher-ups were unhappy with the story or it ran into issues. Sophie Decroisette, head writer of Code Lyoko's first three seasons, described Image Problem as "very difficult to write" after its original writer left the show following the synopsis phase, requiring another writer to step in and finish it. The writing team was also mandated by production to approve 4 scripts per month.

Following the success of the first season, the show was able to have more continuous storylines. Decroisette and show director Jérôme Mouscadet wrote the series' backstory during the break between season 1 and 2. Before Romain left the project, the idea of Lyoko being created by a team of researchers had changed to just one: Franz Hopper. However his motivations and identity were never established. Decroisette revealed during production of season 4 that the full backstory would not be told in the show, as she considered it "very complicated... dense and [not] really important to the story."

The show's international success in the United States also affected production. Romance elements were ultimately reduced after season 2 to appease American audiences. Aside from this, Decroisette otherwise noted that she "never felt censored" while working on the series, apart from a self-imposed restriction to write stories appropriate for children. Bruno Regeste became head writer for Code Lyoko'''s final season, though Decroisette continued writing scripts and closely monitored episodes involving Replikas.

 Animation 
The series' traditional animation was handled overseas by Animation Services Hong Kong Limited. Fantasia Animation and Welkin Animation also worked on the show's first two seasons. The 3D segments were animated in-house by Antefilm's CGI team.

 Episodes 

 Telecast and home media 
The show was first premiered on France 3 on 3 September 2003 and ended on 10 November 2007 in France. In the U.S., the show was also premiered on 19 April 2004 on Cartoon Network. The second season started on 19 September 2005. The two-part XANA Awakens prequel aired on 2–3 October 2006, and the third season started a day later on 4 October 2006. The fourth and final season began on 18 May 2007. The final episode aired on Cartoon Network was "Cousins Once Removed", and the remaining seven episodes were released online at Cartoon Network Video. When the show aired on Cartoon Network, it was simultaneously both part of its after-school weekday afternoon action animation lighter-toned programming block, Miguzi from 2004 until 2007, and also a standalone show on its primetime timeslot. The show aired on Kabillion from 2007 to 2015.

The show also aired in Latin America and Japan on Jetix. In Italy, the show aired on Disney Channel, Rai 2, RaiSat Smash, Rai Gulp and was published on DVD by Delta Pictures under the label 20th Century Fox Home Entertainment.

In January 2011, all four seasons of Code Lyoko were released on iTunes in the U.S. and France by MoonScoop Holdings, although as of May 2019, only seasons 1 and 2 are available and other seasons have been removed. In October 2011, all four seasons were released on Amazon Instant Streaming and on DVD in the U.S., however, these DVDs are now out of print.

All four seasons were made available on Netflix on 6 August 2012, but were removed for unknown reasons. The show was eventually returned to Netflix on 1 October 2020 after being taken down following MoonScoop's bankruptcy for seven years. Since 2015, all of the English-dubbed episodes (including the prequel XANA Awakens) are viewable on YouTube. Since 2019, an upscaled HD version of the series is also available on Amazon Prime Video in the U.S. and the United Kingdom.

 Reception 
Emily Ashby of Common Sense Media gave the show 4/5 stars, writing: "Kids will like the battles in Lyoko -- each plays out much like a video game", and added: "Strategy and teamwork are themes throughout the series." In a 2020 retrospective of the show for Comic Book Resources, Noah Dominguez wrote: "Whether you're a returning traveler or are only visiting Lyoko for the first time, Code Lyoko still holds up as a unique, easily-accessible gem of the 2000s".Code Lyoko was voted as the best show by Canal J viewers in France, and has achieved international fame as well; the show has been rated as one of the best shows on Cartoon Network and Kabillion in the U.S., with Cartoon Network having it rated as the #3 best performing show in 2006 and Kabillion having it as #4 in monthly average views in 2010. The show has reached success in Spain as one of Clan TVE's highest-rated shows, on Italy's Rai2 network, and in Finland and the United Kingdom as well. The show also won France's Prix de l'Export 2006 Award for Animation in December 2006.

 Merchandise 
Several Code Lyoko products have been released, including DVDs, a series of cine-manga by Tokyopop, a series of four novels by Italian publisher Atlantyca Entertainment, apparel, and other accessories. In 2006, Marvel Toys released a line of Code Lyoko toys and action figures.

When the show started to come to an end in 2007, The Game Factory released three video games based on the show: Code Lyoko and Code Lyoko: Fall of X.A.N.A. for the Nintendo DS, and Code Lyoko: Quest for Infinity for the Wii, PSP, and PlayStation 2. The games were met with mixed to positive reviews from critics despite some criticisms of gameplay. There have been other games released through various mediums, one being Facebook.

A series of Clan TVE festivals in Spain included live stage shows based on Code Lyoko among other things. A game show known as Code Lyoko Challenge was planned to be released in late 2012, but fell through.

Novels
A series of four chapter books was released by Atlantyca Entertainment and distributed in Italy and other countries. The novels delve deeper into the unanswered questions of the series. Taking place after the end of the series, X.A.N.A. has miraculously survived and returns though weakened and initially missing its memories. X.A.N.A. possesses Eva Skinner, an American girl, and travels to France in order to infiltrate the gang and kill them off. Unaware of their enemy's presence, the group works to find clues about Aelita's past, left by her father Franz Hopper, and confirm whether or not her mother is still alive somewhere. But at the same time, a terrorist group, the Green Phoenix, has become interested in the supercomputer and intend to use both it and the virtual world of Lyoko for evil purposes.

It was confirmed that the series will never be released officially in English, nor the final two books released in French. However, sometime later, a fan community came together and sought to not only finish the series but translate it into more languages, including English. They have since completed their work and made it available for free download in September 2014.

 See also 

 List of French animated television series
 List of French television series
 Code Lyoko: Evolution, a spin-off of Code Lyoko that continues after the events in the show
 Tron Gridman the Hyper Agent Superhuman Samurai Syber-Squad Miraculous: Tales of Ladybug & Cat Noir Digimon Adventure Zixx ReBoot: The Guardian Code Neon Genesis Evangelion Sword Art Online World Trigger''

Notes

References

External links 

 

 
2000s French animated television series
2003 French television series debuts
2007 French television series endings
Television series about artificial intelligence
Works set in computers
French computer-animated television series
French children's animated action television series
French children's animated adventure television series
French children's animated drama television series
French children's animated science fiction television series
French time travel television series
Fiction about mind control
Television series about parallel universes
Animated television series about robots
Television shows about spirit possession
Television shows about virtual reality
Anime-influenced Western animated television series
Television shows set in Paris
Television series by Splash Entertainment
Malware in fiction
France Télévisions children's television series